The traditional Chinese calendar divides a year into 24 solar terms. Xiǎohán, Shōkan, Sohan, or Tiểu hàn is the 23rd solar term. It begins when the Sun reaches the celestial longitude of 285° and ends when it reaches the longitude of 300°. It more often refers in particular to the day when the Sun is exactly at the celestial longitude of 285°. In the Gregorian calendar, it usually begins around 5 January and ends around 20 January.

Date and time

References

23
Winter time